Sahand Ski Resort is a ski resort in northern slopes of Mount Sahand, in vicinity of Tabriz, North West of Iran. The resort has an ski area with a length of 1200 meters. The ski season in this resort depends on the winter precipitation (normally starts from January and it continues until mid March).

References

Ski areas and resorts in Iran
Sports venues in Tabriz